Colonial Hotel may refer to:

 Colonial Hotel (Excelsior Springs, Missouri), listed on the National Register of Historic Places (NRHP) in Clay County, Missouri
 Colonial Hotel (Wise, Virginia), listed on the NRHP in Wise County, Virginia
 Colonial Hotel (Seattle, Washington), listed on the NRHP in King County, Washington

See also
Colonial Inn (disambiguation)